The Bob Monkhouse Hour was a British televised variety show that ran from 1958 to 1963 which was fronted by the comedian Bob Monkhouse, and featured musical stars of the day, contemporary comedians, and various other variety acts. 

It was preceded by The Bob Monkhouse Show in 1956, and both were early vehicles for the comedian whose first break had been an appearance in Carry On Sergeant in 1958, the first of the popular series of films.

References

BBC Television shows
1958 British television series debuts
1963 British television series endings
1950s British television series
1960s British television series
English-language television shows